Gamariel Mbonimana is a Rwandan historian, Professor Emeritus at the National University of Rwanda. He is "well-known throughout Rwanda for his work as a cultural historian and musicologist".

In 2007 he was called as an expert witness for the prosecution at the trial of Simon Bikindi before the International Criminal Tribunal for Rwanda.

Works
 Musique rwandaise traditionnelle [Traditional Rwandan music]. Butare, Rwanda, 1971.
 (with the Centre de formation et de recherche coopératives) Les coopératives du Rwanda: un creuset de réconciliation et de coexistence pacifique [Rwanda's cooperatives: a crucible of reconciliation and peaceful coexistence]. Kigali, 1997.
 (with Jean de Dieu Karangwa) 'Topical Analysis of the songs ‘Twasezereye’(‘We bade farewell’), ‘Nanga abahutu’(‘I hate Hutu’) and ‘Bene sebahinzi’ (‘The descendants of Sebahinzi’).' Expert Report prepared for the ICTR for The Prosecution vs. Simon Bikindi.  Case no. ICTR=2001=72=I, 2006
 Amateka y'ubuvanganzo Nyarwanda: kuva mu kinyejana cya XVII kugeza magingo aya [History of Rwandan literature: from the 17th century to the present]. 2011.
 Le Rwanda : Etat-Nation at XIXe siècle [Rwanda: a 17th-century nation state]. 2016.

References

Year of birth missing (living people)
Living people
Rwandan historians
Musicologists
Academic staff of the National University of Rwanda